(Pronounced as Kikaider Zero One), is a tokusatsu superhero TV series, and a sequel series to Android Kikaider. Produced by Toei Company and Ishimori Productions, it was broadcast on NET (now TV Asahi) from May 12, 1973 to March 30, 1974, with a total of 46 episodes. Its title in Hawaii is Kikaida 01 (based on the Japanese title).

Kikaider 01 made an appearance alongside Kikaider, Inazuman, and Zubat in the 2011 movie OOO, Den-O, All Riders: Let's Go Kamen Riders.

Plot synopsis
The noted robotics expert Dr. Kohmyoji created a powerful android to protect Japan from evil forces. When Hakaider starts his evil organization, Dr. Kohmyoji's android, Kikaider 01, awakens to fight Hakaider.

Hakaider has three assistants, Red Hakaider, Blue Hakaider, and Silver Hakaider. Together, they devise various schemes to cause destruction, but Kikaider 01 stops them all. Kikaider appears to assist Kikaider 01. Their chief goal is to capture a young boy, named Akira.

After Hakaider's attempts fail, a new, mysterious character appears, Shadow Knight. Shadow Knight is a member of a competing, evil organization, SHADOW. When SHADOW proved to be more powerful than Hakaider, Hakaider unwillingly becomes a member of SHADOW.

It was later revealed that Hakaider has the brain of Professor Gill (also from the Kikaider TV series) within him. Professor Gill had designed a powerful robot and had tattooed the plans onto his two sons: Akira and his brother Hiroshi. Throughout the series, SHADOW helps Gill in building his robot, and Kikaider 01's fights to stop them.

Characters

Heroes
Ichiro/Kikaider 01: A powerful fighting android. In human form, Ichiro uses a trumpet to announce his presence. 01 is solar powered, so Ichiro cannot transform in the dark.
Jiro/Kikaider: Another android fighting for good. In human form, Jiro uses a guitar to announce his presence.
Akira: Professor Gill's second son.
Hiroshi: Professor Gill's oldest son.
Rieko: A mysterious woman from Professor Gill's past. Akira's guardian. Usually appears in disguise.
Misao: Hiroshi's tutor when DARK was operating. She and Hiroshi were made homeless by Kikaider's destruction of the DARK. Misao became a pick-pocket. After death of Rieko, Misao becomes the guardian of both Hiroshi and Akira.
Gunta Momochi: Inept photographer who takes the place of Hanpei. Claims to be decedent of ninja Sandayu Momochi. Last seen in episode 19.
Mari/Bijinder: A female android. Designed to destroy 01 and Kikaider but eventually she becomes 01 and Kikaider's ally and friend.
Waruder: Robot samurai assassin hired by Big Shadow to kill Kikaider 01. He develops feelings for Bijinder, but doesn't understand them. She cannot accept him as long as he insists on killing her friend 01. Likes children, afraid of dogs.

Note: Both Hanpei Hattori and Dr. Kohmyoji (from the Kikaider TV series) make guest appearances

Villains
Big Shadow: Mysterious leader of SHADOW. Originally heard but not seen. When he is first seen its as a shadow. Dresses in black, hides his face behind a mask.
Professor Gill/Hakaider: After the fall of DARK, Gill survived his demise by having his brain transplanted into the body of Hakaider after Kohmyoji's brain was removed from it. He initially leads the Hakaider Squad to destroy Kikaider, but ends up becoming a high ranked member in SHADOW. He can also transform into the Ghostbot Black Dragon, who possesses telekinesis and the Dragon Machine Gun built into his right hand.
Giant Devil: A Giant Robot who's been destroyed by Kikaider and 01 in episode 18.
Shadow Knight: One-eyed android, original second in command of SHADOW. Replaced by Hakaider. Shadow Knight and Hakaider become rivals, not allowing the other to have the glory of defeating 01.
Zadam: Two-headed robot from SHADOW's base on the moon. Replaces Hakaider as second in command of SHADOW. Hakaider and Shadow Knight resent Zadam.

Hakaider Squad
The first set of villains Kikaider 01 encounters, led by Gill-Hakaider who the others being Dark scientists who also transplanted their brains into android bodies. While normally in Hakaider form, they can transform into Ghostbots or combine into Gattaider with numerous powers include flight, body missiles called the Death Missile, teleportation, the weapons of the Hakaiders, and a mentally controlled boomerang on the left shoulder.

Silver Hakaider: His Ghostbot form is Silver Shrimp, whose powers include pincer claw hands, converting himself into blood and a cake, and rolling into a ball called the Rolling Mine. He's been destroyed by Kikaider 01 in episode 10.
Blue Hakaider: His Ghostbot form of Blue Crocodile, whose powers include a portable egg to regenerate, strong stomach acid, and a launchable set of strong jaws. He and Red Hakaider have been destroyed by Kikaider 01 in episode 9.
Red Hakaider: His Ghostbot form is Red Centipede, whose powers include a human disguise, spawning centipedes, explosive launchable venomous spines from the body called the Centipede Spines, and body part separation. He and Blue Hakaider have been destroyed by Kikaider 01 in episode 9.

Soldiers
Androidbots: They're for the Hakaider Squad.
Shadowmen: They're the same design as the Androidbots and for the Evil Organization Shadow.

Deathbots
Deathbots are the commanders of the Shadow.

Crimson Turtle: Appears in episodes 9-11. Powers include a bo staff, a boomerang claw for each hand, and high jumping.
Ghost Woman: Appears in episode 11. Powers include summoning fire balls, levitation, fangs, a 7-tube missile launcher in the left arm called the Deathfire Missile, spinning very fast to burrow underground, and splitting into four shadow men in a technique called the clone attack.
Bakeneko: Appears in episode 12. Powers include morphing into a cat, a human disguise, a mouth flamethrower called the Cat Fire, launchable arms with sharp claws, and head detachment.
Shadow Rokuro-Kubi: Appears in episode 13. Powers include a 2-meter neck used for coiling, teleporting individuals near her, remote controlled arms, neck detachment called the Rokuro Hammer, and two machine guns in each arm socket.
Oiwa Owl: Appears in episode 14. Powers include mouth toxic gas, teleportation, mirror illusions, a human disguise, high jumping, and a pair of explosive dart launchers in the mouth called the Owl Poison Darts.
Shinigami Robot: Appears in episode 15. Powers include a tentacle whip for each arm, a cannon on the head, and teleportation.
Shadow Mummy: Appears in episode 16. Powers include a human disguise, nitro bombs from the right arm, separation and reformation, and dividing into flamingos.
Shadow Golem: Appears in episode 16. Powers include a human disguise, pincer claw hands, sonic waves from the torso speaker called the Hell Ray, and teleportation.
Poisonous Mendicant: Appears in episode 17. Powers include a human disguise, a bamboo flamethrower in the right palm, and explosive head rings.
King Indian: Appears in episode 19. Powers include a human powers, a bow and arrows, telepathic explosions called the Curse of Death, a tomahawk, and a knife.
Vampire Bats: Appear in episode 21. Powers include clawed detachable wing bombs called the Dracula Cloak, regeneration, flight, and a detachable head armed with a mouth flamethrower called the Dracula Head.
Scorpion Strong: Appears in episode 22. Powers include a human disguise, invisibility, explosive gas from the claws and tail, and hypnotic eyes.
Automated Skeleton: Appears in episode 22. Powers include launchable arms and a mouth flamethrower.
Thorned Starfish: Appears in episode 23. Powers include a human disguise, squid whip arms, spawning starbots from severed body parts in a technique called the Dividing Starfish, and an acid stream from the face called the Acid Blast.
Pigman: Appear in episode 24. Powers include pig transformation, a knife, and teleportation.
Mad Pig: Appears in episode 24. Powers include a human disguise, a mouth flamethrower called the Pig Fire, and a chain in the launchable nose called the Pig Nose.
Tengu Flying Squirrel: Appears in episode 26. Powers include a human disguise, a wooden staff, and teleportation.
Hell Kappa: Appears in episodes 26 & 27. Powers include swimming, strong grabbing, and a hydrogen bomb on his back.
Mermabot: Appears in episode 28. Powers include a human disguise, a blinding beam from the body called Mermaid Spin Beam, teleportation, a mantis claw for the left hand, explosive scales on the waist called the Mermaid Scale Attack, a laser from the scalp probe called the Angler Laser, and a pair of bombs called the Mermaid Breast Bombs.
Raijin Plus and Raijin Minus: Appear in episode 29. Powers include a pair of thundersticks, electromotive force that freezes objects, electric explosions called the Thunder Shock, teleportation, brain freezing using flying drums that makes organisms lazy, stun bolts called the Thunder Chain, converting in 10 giga bolt attack called the Thunder Death Beam, and their drum rings like boomerangs.
Pollution Catfish: Appears in episode 30. Powers include swimming, toxic mouth gas called the Catfish Gas, liquid bombs from the body that become invisible after ground contact, a human disguise, a pair of extendable whiskers called the Deadly Catfish Whiskers, teleportation, and stomping hard enough to cause an earthquake called the Catfish Quake.
Inked Squid: Appears in episode 32. Powers include low explosive body ink from the right hand called Ink Bombs, a whip for the left arm, mouth flames called the Ink Squid Flame, a human disguise, and teleportation.
Big Gorilla: Appears in episode 33. Powers include armor that records attack data and a bazooka in the right hand called the Gorilla Bazooka.
Mini Gorilla: Appears in episode 33. He possesses no known powers.
Crazy Cuckoo: Appears in episode 34. Powers include disguising himself as a statue, eye sound waves that cause violence called the Second Cycle Sound Wave, teleportation, and a beak cannon called the Crazy Cuckoo Cannon.
Kimono Poison Fang: Appears in episode 35. Powers include disguising herself as a kimono and wig, sharp claws for fingers, and mentally spawning embers called the Kimono Poison Fang Flame.
Spaceman Robots: Appears in episode 39. Their only known power is a freezing and melting hybrid gun.
Satan: 41 His only known power is flight.
Roboshadows: Appear in episode 42. Their only known power is explosive gas from the fingertips.
01 Shadow: Appears in episode 42. Possesses no known powers.
Bijinder Shadow: Appears in episode 42. Possesses no known powers.
Waruder Shadow: Appears in episode 42. His only know power is a chained harpoon.
Aqualungbots: Appears in episode 43. Powers include swimming and explosive flashes.
Warrior Ronin Robots: Appears in episode 45. Powers include ink seeking katanas and teleportation.

Episode list

Cast
: 
: 
: 
: 
: 
: 
: 
: 
: 
: 
: 
: 
: 
: 
: 
: 
: 
: 
: 
:  (Played as )
: 
:

Media

OVA
An OVA version was released on June 30, 2003, called . It served as a sequel to Android Kikaider: The Animation.

Home Video
Released on DVD in Hawaii by JN Productions/Generation Kikaida in 2008

Kamen Rider 40th Anniversary film

This brief appearance saw the four heroes destroy the Kamen Rider Stronger villain, General Shadow.

References

External links
 

1973 Japanese television series debuts
1973 manga
1974 Japanese television series endings
Androids in television
Shotaro Ishinomori
Toei tokusatsu
Tokusatsu television series
TV Asahi original programming